Kevin Lytwyn (born April 21, 1991) is a Canadian artistic gymnast. In 2015, he won the silver medal in the men's horizontal bar event at the 2015 Pan American Games held in Toronto, Canada.

In 2014, he competed at the 2014 Commonwealth Games in Glasgow, Scotland. He won the silver medal in the men's rings event and the bronze medal in the men's horizontal bar event. He also won the bronze medal in the men's artistic team all-around event.

References

External links 
 

Living people
1991 births
Place of birth missing (living people)
Canadian male artistic gymnasts
Gymnasts at the 2015 Pan American Games
Medalists at the 2015 Pan American Games
Pan American Games silver medalists for Canada
Pan American Games medalists in gymnastics
Gymnasts at the 2014 Commonwealth Games
Commonwealth Games silver medallists for Canada
Commonwealth Games bronze medallists for Canada
Commonwealth Games medallists in gymnastics
20th-century Canadian people
21st-century Canadian people
Medallists at the 2014 Commonwealth Games